{{DISPLAYTITLE:C8H15NO}}
The molecular formula C8H15NO (molar mass: 141.21 g/mol, exact mass: 141.1154 u) may refer to:

 3,3-Diethyl-2-pyrrolidinone (DEABL)
 Hygrine
 Pseudotropine (PTO)
 Tropine

Molecular formulas